Emily Donovan (born 1997 or 1998) is an English footballer who plays as a midfielder for London Bees in the FA Women's Championship.

Career
Having come through the youth team at Yeovil Town, she signed her first contract with the club in 2015. She was released at the end of the 2016 season, and signed for Oxford United in February 2017. She returned to Yeovil Town in 2018 before joining Lewes in 2019. On 1 February 2021, she was signed by London Bees.

References

External links

Year of birth missing (living people)
Living people
English women's footballers
Women's association football midfielders
Yeovil Town L.F.C. players
Oxford United W.F.C. players
Lewes F.C. Women players
Women's Super League players
Women's Championship (England) players